Delias mira is a butterfly in the family Pieridae. It was described by Walter Rothschild in 1904. It is endemic to New Guinea.

The wingspan is about 60 mm.

Subspecies
D. m. mira (Owen Stanley Range, Papua New Guinea)
D. m. cieko Arima, 1996 (Baliem, Pass Valley, Star Mountains)
D. m. excelsa Jordan, 1930 (New Guinea, Herzog Mountains)
D. m. flabella van Mastrigt, 1995 (Irian Jaya)
D. m. reversa Rothschild, 1925 (New Guinea, Sattleburg, Rawlinson Mountains)
D. m. roepkei Sanford & Bennett, 1955 (Central Highlands, Papua New Guinea)

References

External links
Delias at Markku Savela's Lepidoptera and Some Other Life Forms

mira
Butterflies described in 1904
Endemic fauna of New Guinea